Carveol is a natural unsaturated, monocyclic monoterpenoid alcohol that is a constituent of spearmint essential oil in the form of cis-(−)-carveol. It is a colorless fluid soluble in oils, but insoluble in water and has an odor and flavor that resemble those of spearmint and caraway.  Consequently, it is used as a fragrance in cosmetics and as a flavor additive in the food industry.

It has been found to exhibit chemoprevention of mammary carcinogenesis (prevents breast cancer).

An alpha-trans-dihydroxy derivative, (1R,2R,6S)-3-methyl-6-(prop-1-en-2-yl)cyclohex-3-ene-1,2-diol, possesses potent antiparkinsonian activity in animal models.

References

Monoterpenes
Cyclohexenols